The 2016–17 Colorado Avalanche season was the 22nd operational season and 21st playing season for the Colorado Avalanche since the franchise relocated from Quebec prior to the start of the 1995–96 NHL season, as well as the franchise's 38th season in the National Hockey League and 45th season overall. 

Under first-year head coach Jared Bednar, the Avalanche got off to a respectable start, and were only two games below .500 by December 1. However, they only won a total of four games in December and January. By the All-Star Break, they were 13-31-2, and their season was all but finished. They would only win nine more games after that to finish 22-56-4, the worst record in the NHL. They missed the playoffs for the third consecutive year. They finished the season with their fewest points since moving to Denver in 1995, and their fewest since 1990–91, which was also the last time the franchise finished in last place overall. The Avalanche's 48 points were among the fewest for a non-expansion team since 1967, and the fewest for any team playing an 82-game season where one point is earned for losing in overtime or a shootout.

Off-season
On August 11, 2016, Patrick Roy resigned as head coach and vice president of hockey operations. On August 25, the Avalanche hired Jared Bednar of the American Hockey League's Cleveland Monsters as Roy's replacement. He had led the Monsters to winning the AHL championship in the previous season. Bednar was hired less than a month before the start of training camp. With nowhere near enough time to assemble his own staff, he was forced to retain Roy's assistants. He was also unable to install his own system.

Standings

Schedule and results

Pre-season

Regular season

Player stats

Skaters

Goaltenders

†Denotes player spent time with another team before joining the Avalanche. Stats reflect time with the Avalanche only.
‡Traded mid-season
Bold/italics denotes franchise record

Transactions
The Colorado Avalanche were involved in the following transactions during the 2016–17 NHL season.

Trades

Free agents acquired

Free agents lost

Claimed via waivers

Lost via waivers

Lost via retirement

Player signings

Draft picks

Below are the Colorado Avalanche's selections at the 2016 NHL Entry Draft, to be held on June 24–25, 2016 at the First Niagara Center in Buffalo.

Draft notes

 The Colorado Avalanche's second-round pick was re-acquired as the result of a trade on June 27, 2015 that sent Buffalo's second-round pick in 2015 to San Jose in exchange for a second-round pick in 2015, Colorado's sixth-round pick in 2017 and this pick.
San Jose previously acquired this pick as the result of a trade on July 1, 2014 that sent Brad Stuart to Colorado in exchange for a sixth-round pick in 2017 and this pick.

 The Colorado Avalanche's fourth-round pick went to the Toronto Maple Leafs as the result of a trade on February 21, 2016 that sent Shawn Matthias to Colorado in exchange for Colin Smith and this pick.

References

Colorado Avalanche seasons
Colorado Avalanche
Colorado Avalanche
Colorado Avalanche